Album is a 2016 Turkish comedy film directed by Mehmet Can Mertoğlu. It was screened in the International Critics' Week section at the 2016 Cannes Film Festival where it won the France 4 Visionary Award.

Cast
 Sebnem Bozoklu as Bahar Bahtiyaroglu
 Murat Kiliç as Cüneyt Bahtiyaroglu

References

External links
 

2016 films
2016 comedy films
2016 directorial debut films
Turkish black comedy films
2010s Turkish-language films
French black comedy films
Romanian comedy films
2010s French films